Once Upon a Dead Man is an English indie rock band formed in 2015. The quartet consists of brothers Charlie, Will and Edd Simpson alongside long term friend Simon Britcliffe.

History
Once Upon a Dead Man had been in the works since at least 2012, when the three Simpson brothers performed together to cover Bon Iver. In 2016, after Fightstar has completed touring in support of their new album Behind the Devil's Back and ahead of Busted's reunion tour, the band released their first single "The Canopy" and officially unveiled themselves to the public, announcing a 1 April digital release of their debut EP, Concepts and Phenomena. In March they released their second single, "Give Up", before streaming the whole EP on 31 March. On 2 April, they released a music video for the song "Threads".

Discography
Extended plays
Concepts and Phenomena (2016)

References

Musical groups established in 2015
English indie rock groups
2015 establishments in England